HD 196775 (HR 7899) is a solitary star in the equatorial constellation Delphinus. It has an apparent magnitude of 5.98, allowing it to be faintly seen with the naked eye. HD 196775 has a high peculiar velocity of  compared to neighboring stars, indicating that it may be a runaway star.

HD 196775 has a general stellar classification of B3 V, indicating that it is an ordinary B-type main-sequence star. However, once source gives it a class of B4 Vn, making it slightly cooler and having broad absorption lines due to rapid rotation.

HD 196775 has four faint optical companions whose parameters are listed below.

References

Delphinus (constellation)
B-type main-sequence stars
196775
101909
7899
+15 4220
Runaway stars